Volginia is a genus of mites in the family Acaridae.

Species
 Volginia talyshiana Kadzhaya, 1967

References

Acaridae